Auguste Hilbert (28 August 1889 – 22 May 1957) was a Luxembourgian bobsledder. He competed in the four-man event at the 1928 Winter Olympics.

References

1889 births
1957 deaths
Luxembourgian male bobsledders
Olympic bobsledders of Luxembourg
Bobsledders at the 1928 Winter Olympics
People from Mamer